Springdale, also known as Half Moon, Alexander Trimble House, Holly Hill, and the Dixon House / Farm, is a historic home located near Lexington, Rockbridge County, Virginia. It was built about 1812, and reached its present form in 1914. The brick dwelling consists of a two-story, three-bay, pedimented, central section flanked by two-story wings. The interior features Federal style decorative details. The full-length front porch with a pediment above the front entrance replaced the original, smaller porch in 1914.

It was listed on the National Register of Historic Places in 2006.

References

Houses on the National Register of Historic Places in Virginia
Federal architecture in Virginia
Houses completed in 1812
Houses in Rockbridge County, Virginia
National Register of Historic Places in Rockbridge County, Virginia
1812 establishments in Virginia